Euphorbia griseola is a species of plant in the family Euphorbiaceae.

References

griseola
Plants described in 1904